Lester is an ancient Anglo-Saxon surname and given name.

People

Given name
 Lester Bangs (1948–1982), American music critic
 Lester Oliver Bankhead (1912–1997), American architect
 Lester W. Bentley (1908–1972), American artist from Wisconsin
 Lester Bird (1938–2021), second prime minister of Antigua and Barbuda (1994–2004)
 Lester Cotton (born 1996), American football player
 Lester del Rey (1915–1993), American science fiction author and editor
 Lester Flatt (1914–1979), American bluegrass musician
 Lester Gillis (1908–1934), better known as Baby Face Nelson, American gangster
 Lester Holt (born 1959), American television journalist
 Lester Charles King (1907–1989), English geomorphologist
 Lester Lanin (1907–2004), American jazz and pop music bandleader
 Lester Lockett (1912–2005), American Negro League baseball player
 Lester Maddox (1915–2003), governor and lieutenant governor of the U.S. state of Georgia
 Lester Patrick (1883–1960), Canadian ice hockey player and coach
 Lester B. Pearson (1897–1972), fourteenth Prime Minister of Canada
 Lester Piggott (1935–2022), English jockey
 Lester Prosper (born 1988), Indonesian basketball player
 Lester Quiñones (born 2000), Dominican-American basketball player
 Lester Speight (born 1963), American actor, former football player and wrestler; known for his portrayal as Terry Tate, Office Linebacker
 Lester Thurow (1938–2016), American economist
 Lester Young (1909–1959), American jazz tenor saxophonist

Surname
 Adrian Lester (born 1968), British actor
 Albert Lester (c. 1803–1867), New York politician
 Brad Lester (born 1985), collegiate American football player
 Gavin Lester (born 1977), Australian rugby league footballer
 Jack Lester (born 1975), English football (soccer) player
 Jenna Lester (born 1989), American dermatologist
 Sir Jim Lester (1932–2021), British politician 
 John Lester (1871–1969), American cricketer
 Jon Lester (born 1984), American baseball player
 Josh Lester (born 1994), American baseball player
 Julia Lester (born 2000), American actress
 Julius Lester (1939–2018), American writer
 Lashonda Lester (c. 1975–2017), American stand-up comedian
 Luke Fleet Lester, American engineer
 Mark L. Lester (born 1946), American film producer
 Mary Louise Lester (1919–1977), All-American Girls Professional Baseball League player
 Marsha I. Lester, American physical chemist
 Paul Lester, British music journalist
 Paul Martin Lester (born 1953), American communications professor and author
 Phil Lester (born 1987), British YouTuber and BBC Radio 1 presenter
 Robert "Squirrel" Lester (1942–2010), American singer, original member of the vocal group The Chi-Lites
 Robie Lester (1925-2005), American actress
 Richard Lester (born 1932), British film director
 Richard Neville Lester (1937–2006), British botanist
 Ryan Lester (born 1992), Australian rules footballer
 Seán Lester (1880–1959), Irish diplomat
 Sonny Lester (1924–2018), American record producer
 Tom Lester (1938–2020), American actor
 Tom Lester (American football) (1927–2012), American football coach
 William "Buddy" Lester (1915–2002), American actor and comedian
 Yami Lester (1941–2017), Australian Indigenous rights advocate

Fictional characters
 James Lester, from the television series Primeval
 Lester Patel, from the television series Chuck
 Lester Freamon, from the television show The Wire
 Lester Krinklesac, from the television show The Cleveland Show
 Lester Nessman from the television show WKRP in Cincinnati
 Lester Nygaard, from the television series Fargo
 Lester Sludge, from the television show M.A.S.K.
 Lester Crest, from the video game Grand Theft Auto V
 Lester Papadopoulos, from the book series Trials of Apollo by Rick Riordan
 Lester Burnham, main character in the film American Beauty

See also

Middle name 
 H. Lester Hooker (1921–1999), American college basketball and baseball coach
 Leicester, a city in England pronounced the same way as "Lester"

English masculine given names
English-language surnames
English toponymic surnames